The Three Musketeers is a Windows XP and Windows Vista platform game published and developed by Swedish developer-publisher Legendo Entertainment. It was released in Europe on February 22, 2006, and is rated 7+ by PEGI. The European release,  which included Scandinavian releases in partnership with Ubisoft, saw the game sold both in boxed form at retail outlets and online; in other territories, the game may only be downloaded. The game supports more than ten different settings for various languages. A WiiWare version entitled The Three Musketeers: One for all! was released in North America on July 27, 2009 and in the PAL regions on July 31, 2009.

Gameplay

The game, which features two-dimensional movement through a cartoonish three-dimensional environment, is loosely based on the 1844 Alexandre Dumas, père classic The Three Musketeers. It is the first video game to use this novel as its source material. In the game, the player controls Porthos in an attempt to save his kidnapped companions.

Reception

The game was nominated for a 2006 Swedish Game Award in the category Family Game of the Year. In contrast, the UK Official Nintendo Magazine gave the WiiWare version 20%, saying,"There are hundreds of games that are worth your money more than this hopelessly generic, lazily conceived side-scroller". Thus, it currently stands as the lowest score that the magazine has given to a WiiWare game.

References

External links

2005 video games
Video games developed in Sweden
Windows games
Windows-only games
Video games based on works by Alexandre Dumas
Video games set in France
Video games set in the 17th century
Legendo Entertainment games
Single-player video games
Works based on The Three Musketeers